Mercyful Fate is the first official release by Danish heavy metal band Mercyful Fate. It is also known as Nuns Have No Fun, the "first album" or the "EP". It is a four track, 45rpm effort and was recorded and mixed at Stone Studio in Roosendaal, Netherlands, in two days in September 1982, and released on the independent label Rave-On Records as RMLP-002. The album was produced and mixed by Jac Hustinx and engineered by Willem Steetjes. The cover is drawn by Ole Poulsen. The album in its entirety was later re-issued in 1987 as part of The Beginning compilation.

There are three pressings:
 First pressing is white bordered.
 Second pressing is black bordered.
 Third pressing is black bordered but distributed by Bertus Holland.

Track listing 
Side A
 "A Corpse Without Soul" (Hank Shermann, King Diamond) – 6:53
 "Nuns Have No Fun" (Shermann, Michael Denner, Diamond) – 4:17

Side B
 "Doomed by the Living Dead" (Shermann, Diamond) – 5:06
 "Devil Eyes" (Shermann, Diamond) – 5:48

Credits 
 King Diamond – vocals
 Hank Shermann – guitar
 Michael Denner – guitar
 Timi Hansen – bass
 Kim Ruzz – drums

References 

Mercyful Fate albums
1982 debut EPs